Paul House may refer to:
 Paul D. House (1943–2021), Canadian businessman and executive chairman of TDL Group Corporation
 Paul R. House (born 1958), American Old Testament scholar and former president of the Evangelical Theological Society